The Toronto Waterfront Marathon is an annual marathon held in Toronto, Ontario, Canada in October. The race day also includes a half marathon and 5 km race.

The race has quickly become an elite level marathon and is one of just five World Athletics Gold Label Road Race marathons in North America. At the 2013 edition of the race, race winner Deressa Chimsa broke the men's course record with the fastest marathon ever recorded on Canadian soil. In the 2011 edition of the race, race winner Koren Jelela Yal broke the women's course record with the fastest marathon ever recorded on Canada soil.  Canadian runner Ed Whitlock set multiple age group world records at the Waterfront Marathon, including a record in the 75 to 79 age group with a time of 3:08:35 in 2006, and a record in the 85 to 89 age group with a time of 3:56:33 in 2016.

In the 2018 race, Cam Levins broke Jerome Drayton's 43-year-old Canadian men's national record for the marathon, finishing fourth in 2:09:25, a 44-second improvement on the previous mark set by Drayton in 1975.

The 2020 in-person race was cancelled due to concerns surrounding the global COVID-19 coronavirus pandemic (as was the case for the May 2020 Goodlife Fitness Toronto Marathon event), although virtual races were to be held instead from October 1 to 31 2020 instead.

Winners

Key:

Multiple wins

By country

Charities
The Scotiabank Toronto Waterfront Marathon has successfully raised millions of dollars for charity since its inception. The largest charity attending the marathon for the past three years has been the Engineers Without Borders organization, which uses donations from the marathon for its Run to End Poverty initiative.

See also
 List of marathon races in North America

References

List of winners
Toronto Waterfront Marathon. Association of Road Racing Statisticians (2011-10-18). Retrieved on 2011-10-23.

External links 
Official Website
Full Results

Marathons in Canada
Sports competitions in Toronto
Recurring sporting events established in 2000
2000 establishments in Ontario
Fall events in Canada